O Mur Apunar Dekh is the state and traditional song of Assam, India. It was written by Lakshminath Bezbarua and the tune was made by Kamala Prasad Agarwala. It was first published in 1909 in an Assamese magazine named Bahi ("flute"). It was officially adopted as the Assam's state song in 1927 at asom chatrô sônmilôn ("Assam Student Conference") held in Tezpur.

The song was translated to Mising by Tabu Taid.

The song

The key of the song is D major and it's rhythm is waltz. The song was translated by Krishna Dulal Barua.

See also

 List of Indian state songs

References

External links
O Mur Apunar Desh

Assamese literature
Symbols of Assam
Indian state songs